Sean Selmser (born November 10, 1974) is a Canadian-born Austrian former professional ice hockey player. He played in one NHL game for the Columbus Blue Jackets during the 2000–01 NHL season.

Career
After spending four seasons with Vienna Capitals in the Austrian Hockey League, he joined Coventry Blaze for the 2010-2011 Elite Ice Hockey League season where he was Alternate Captain. Selsmer joined Dornbirner EC of the second-tier Austrian National League. After scoring a career-high 59 points at age 38, Selsmer announced his retirement from professional hockey in May 2012.

Personal
Selsmer was a head instructor at Summer Hockeyskolen, a summer hockey school located in Norway, from 1996 until 2000.

As a member of the Coventry Blaze, Selmser also attended nearby Coventry University and enrolled in several courses.

Since his retirement, Selsmer has become a sales representative for a Calgary-based mining company.

Career statistics

See also
List of players who played only one game in the NHL

References

External links

1974 births
Living people
Canadian ice hockey left wingers
Ayr Scottish Eagles players
Columbus Blue Jackets players
Coventry Blaze players
Dornbirn Bulldogs players
EC VSV players
Fort Wayne Komets players
Graz 99ers players
Hamilton Bulldogs (AHL) players
Hampton Roads Admirals players
Ice hockey people from Calgary
Manitoba Moose (IHL) players
Moose Jaw Warriors players
Pittsburgh Penguins draft picks
Portland Pirates players
Red Deer Rebels players
Syracuse Crunch players
Vienna Capitals players
Canadian expatriate ice hockey players in Austria
Naturalised citizens of Austria
Canadian expatriate ice hockey players in the United States
Canadian expatriate ice hockey players in Scotland
Canadian expatriate ice hockey players in England
Austrian expatriate sportspeople in England